was a  after Kengen and before Tokuji. This period spanned the years from August 1303 through December 1306.

Change of era
 1303 : The new era name was created to mark an event or series of events. The previous era ended and the new one commenced in Kengen 2.

Events of the Kagen era
 July 17–27, 1303 (Kagen 1, 13th-23rd days of the 6th month): A white comet ("broom star") was seen at azimuth in the northeast each day at dawn for 10 days.
 October 4, 1305 (Kagen 3, 15th days of the 9th month): Former Emperor Kameyama's death.

Notes

References
 Nussbaum, Louis-Frédéric and Käthe Roth. (2005).  Japan encyclopedia. Cambridge: Harvard University Press. ;  OCLC 58053128
 Pankenier, David W., Zhentao Xu and Yaotiao Jiang. (2008). Archaeoastronomy in East Asia: Historical Observational Records of Comets and Meteor Showers from China, Japan, and Korea. Amherst, New York: Cambria Press.  ;  OCLC 269455845
 Titsingh, Isaac. (1834). Nihon Odai Ichiran; ou,  Annales des empereurs du Japon.  Paris: Royal Asiatic Society, Oriental Translation Fund of Great Britain and Ireland. OCLC 5850691
 Varley, H. Paul. (1980). A Chronicle of Gods and Sovereigns: Jinnō Shōtōki of Kitabatake Chikafusa. New York: Columbia University Press. ;  OCLC 6042764

External links
 National Diet Library, "The Japanese Calendar" -- historical overview plus illustrative images from library's collection

Japanese eras
1300s in Japan